Afipsip is a rural locality (an aul) and the administrative center of Afipsipskoye Rural Settlement of Takhtamukaysky District, the Republic of Adygea, Russia. The population was 2193 as of 2018. There are 35 streets.

Geography 
The aul is located on the shore of the Shapsug water reservoir of the Afips River, 31 km northwest of Takhtamukay (the district's administrative centre) by road. Kubanstroy is the nearest rural locality.

Ethnicity 
The aul is inhabited by Adyghes and Russians.

References 

Rural localities in Takhtamukaysky District